Neil Carson (born 25 January 1973) is a former Irish cricketer. He was a left-handed batsman and right-arm medium-pace bowler. His career playing for Ireland got off to an excellent start in 1998 with a half-century against Bangladesh, and he went on to represent his country on 22 occasions, including two first-class and three List A matches. He also represented Northern Ireland in the cricket tournament at the 1998 Commonwealth Games, a tournament which consisted of his first three List A matches.

References

1973 births
Living people
Irish cricketers
Cricketers from Northern Ireland
Cricketers at the 1998 Commonwealth Games
Commonwealth Games competitors for Northern Ireland
People from Banbridge